Joint Venture is a compilation album released by the Kottonmouth Kings on November 15, 2005.  The album contains new Kottonmouth Kings songs, remixes, and songs by Kingspade, One Session, and Daddy X.  The album peaked at #193 on the Billboard 200 and #13 on the Top Independent Albums charts during the week of December 3, 2005.

Track listing

Bonus DVD

References

Kottonmouth Kings albums
2005 albums
Suburban Noize Records albums